Miyawaki may refer to:

 Akira Miyawaki (1928–2021), Japanese botanist
, Japanese fencer
, Japanese footballer
 Sakura Miyawaki (born 1998), Japanese and Korean pop idol
 Shion Miyawaki (born 1990), Japanese pop singer
 Miyawaki (wrestler) (born 1977), Japanese professional wrestler
 Mitski Miyawaki (born 1990), Japanese-American singer-songwriter

Japanese-language surnames